Alice Beatrice (Biddy) Waymouth (1884–1963) was a New Zealand metalworker and artist. Her work is held in the collection of the Canterbury Museum, Christchurch.

Biography 
Waymouth was the daughter of Frederick and Alice Waymouth, and had a sister Eleanor who also became a notable artist. Her parents built a homestead named Karewa in Fendalton, Christchurch in 1899-1890, where Waymouth grew up. The property was sold and renamed in 1905 and became the historic place known as Mona Vale.  

Waymouth trained as an art metalworker and enameller. She travelled to England around 1905 or 1906 and studied at Charles Robert Ashbee's Guild of Handicraft in Chipping Campden.

Waymouth exhibited and sold work in the 1906–1907 New Zealand International Exhibition held in Christchurch.

In 1911 she visited England again and met and married the brother-in-law of her sister Eleanor, J.C. Hughes.

References 

1884 births
1964 deaths
20th-century New Zealand artists
Women enamellers